Ivica Vulić (born 27 December 1973) is a Slovenian retired international footballer who played as a forward. He has 3 children.

Career
Vulić was capped once by the Slovenian national team, in a 1996 loss against Bosnia and Herzegovina.

References

External links
 Player profile at NZS 
 

1973 births
Living people
Slovenian footballers
Association football forwards
ND Gorica players
NK Primorje players
FC Tirol Innsbruck players
NK Brda players
Slovenian PrvaLiga players
Slovenia international footballers